Precaution (1820) is the first novel by American author James Fenimore Cooper.

Plot

Precaution is set in the spring of 1815 in Northamptonshire, England. It follows the relationship of Emily Moseley and George Denbigh.

Development history
The novel was written after a challenge made by his wife Susan. Cooper was reading aloud to her from an English novel but found it dull. He threw the book aside and declared he could write a better book than that himself. Susan Cooper challenged her husband to make good on the statement. The result was Precaution, which was published anonymously and instead accredited to an English woman. The publisher, A. T. Goodrich, later surprised the public by revealing that Precaution was authored by a man from New York.

Cooper later noted that, in writing Precaution, he "embraced a crude effort to describe foreign manners". He responded to critics who thought he should focus on American topics by using a more patriotic theme in his next book, The Spy.

Auguste Defauconpret translated Precaution into French in 1825.

Literary significant and reception
Precaution was written in imitation of contemporary English domestic novels like those of Jane Austen and Amelia Opie, and it did not meet with contemporary success. It did, however, make Cooper realize his potential as a writer. The author went on to have great success with works such as The Pathfinder (1841) and The Deerslayer (1840). The American reading public responded most to The Last of the Mohicans (1826).

References

Sources
Url

External links

1820 American novels
Novels by James Fenimore Cooper